In the United States, commercial finance is the function of offering loans to businesses. Commercial financing is generally offered by a bank or other commercial lender. Most commercial banks offer commercial financing, and the loans are either secured by business assets or alternatively can be unsecured, where the lender relies on the cash flows of the business to repay the facility.

Assets used to collateralize commercial finance loans include:
 Real estate
 Receivables from invoices
 Equipment or supplies

While qualifying for financing is generally easier for large, well-established companies, some small businesses can qualify for commercial financing from the Small Business Administration (SBA). The SBA may provide either financing or insure a lender who takes a risk on a smaller company to provide commercial finance.

Businesses can also seek the assistance of Commercial finance advisors in the structuring and sourcing of commercial finance. These are known as Independent Financial Advisers or Commercial Finance Brokers.

See also 
 Finance

References 

Corporate finance
Loans